Cardiac disease in China is on the rise. Though incidences of heart disease have increased faster in the city than in the countryside, rural morbidity and mortality rates are now on the rise as well. Health statistics shows that the ischemic heart disease mortality rate in rural China has approximately doubled since 1988.

Unlike in developed countries, there is no preventive or primary health care system in place to stop the rise of cardiac disease. The real extent of heart disease in rural China is unknown because statistics are fraught with error and bias due to difficulties in ascertaining cause of death in places where 90% die without seeing a doctor. Therefore, there is a need to ascertain the real incidence and prevalence of heart disease and to develop adequate preventive and primary care in the Chinese countryside.

Stroke

Stroke is the largest cardiovascular killer in China at about 40% of total mortality in 2007 (approx. 280 per 100 000)

References

Further reading
Liu, Lisheng. "Cardiovascular diseases in China". Biochemistry and Cell Biology, Volume 85, Number 2, 1 April 2007, pp. 157–163(7)
Richard A Jonas, MD. Evolving Healthcare for Congenital Heart Disease in China Asian Cardiovasc Thorac Ann 1998;6:151-152
Vitamin B12 & Folic Acid Supplementation Proved to Prevent Heart Disease and Stroke in China - Chinese University of Hong Kong, 6 May 2006
Jin Ling Tang and Yong Hua Hu. Drugs for preventing cardiovascular disease in China BMJ 2005;330;610-611
The current state of cardiology in China IJC Volume 96, Issue 3, Pages 425-439 (September 2004)
Welcome to Tsung O Cheng, Roving Ambassador for Chinese Cardiovascular Science
Tsung O. Cheng Diets play a major role in heart diseases in China Lipids Volume 39, Number 3 / March, 2004

External links
China, "Bridging the Gap" Project collaborative project between the World Heart Federation, the Beijing Institute of Heart, Lung & Blood Vessel Diseases-Beijing Anzhen Hospital, the Chinese Society of Cardiology and the China National Health Heart Programme.
China-California Heart Watch (China Cal) - A non-profit corporation dedicated to understanding and relieving problems of heart disease and health care in rural China
Study Warns Of Growing Cardiovascular Disease Epidemic In China As Western Diets And Lifestyles Are Adopted 17 Apr 2006

National organizations
International Chinese Heart Health Network (ICHHN)

Projects
Zhengming Chen MBBS DPhil

Health in China